Francis Robert Raines  (22 February 1805 – 17 October 1878) was the Anglican vicar of Milnrow, Lancashire, known as an antiquary. He edited 23 volumes for the Chetham Society publications. He also transcribed 44 volumes of manuscripts.

Early life
He was born 22 February 1805 in Whitby, the son of Isaac Raines, M.D. and Ann, daughter of Joseph Robertson. At thirteen years old, he was sent to Clitheroe, Lancashire, as an apprentice surgeon. He later moved to Burnley with his employer, during which time he went to the Clitheroe and Burnley Grammar Schools. In 1826, he was released from his apprenticeship and admitted to St. Bees' Theological College.

Career
He was ordained in 1828, and after short appointments at Saddleworth and Rochdale, he was vicar at Milnrow for the rest of his life. He was a founder Member of the Chetham Society, serving as a Member of Council from 1843, and as Vice-President from 1858.

Raines died after a short illness at Scarborough on 17 October 1878, aged 73, and was buried in Milnrow churchyard.

Works
Francis Gastrell, Notitia Cestriensis: Or Historical Notices of the Diocese of Chester (1850) editor
Miscellanies: being a selection from the poems and correspondence of the Rev. T. Wilson (1857). Concerns Thomas Wilson  (1747–1813).
A History of the Chantries Within the County Palatine of Lancaster: Being the Reports of the Royal Commissioners of Henry VIII., Edward VI. and Queen Mary (1862) editor
William Dugdale, The Visitation of the County Palatine of Lancaster, Made in the Year 1664-5 (1872–73) editor
The Vicars of Rochdale (1883)
The Rectors of Manchester, and the Wardens of the Collegiate Church of that Town (1885)
The Fellows of the Collegiate Church of Manchester (1891)

References

External links
The Raines Collection (PDF)
Francis Raines Papers, John Rylands Library, University of Manchester
Chetham Society
Family history

1805 births
1878 deaths
People educated at Burnley Grammar School
19th-century English Anglican priests
English antiquarians
People from Whitby
Chetham Society